Hermeticism in poetry, or hermetic poetry, is a form of obscure and difficult poetry, as of the Symbolist school, wherein the language and imagery are subjective, and where the suggestive power of the sound of words is as important as their meaning. The name alludes to the mythical Hermes Trismegistus.

Hermeticism was influential in the Renaissance, after the translation into Latin of a compilation of Greek Hermetic treatises called the Corpus Hermeticum by Marsilio Ficino (1433–1499). Within the Novecento Italiano, Hermetic poetry became an Italian literary movement in the 1920s and 1930s, developing between the two world wars. Major features of this movement were reduction to essentials, abolishment of punctuation, and brief, synthetic compositions, at times resulting in short works of only two or three verses.

Terminology
The term ermetismo was coined in Italian by literary critic Francesco Flora (although with a very generic and superficial connotation) in 1936 and recalls a mystic conception of the poetic word because it makes reference to the legendary figure of Hermes Trismegistus  (Thrice-Great Hermes) going back to hellenistic times, with writings such as Asclepius and the Corpus Hermeticum attributed to him. During the same year (1936), Italian poet Carlo Bo published an essay on the literary magazine Il Frontespizio, by the title "Letteratura come vita (Literature as a way of life)", containing the theoretical-methodological fundamentals of hermetic poetry.

On the literary plane, the term Hermeticism thus highlights a type of poetry which has a close (i.e., hermetic, hidden, sealed) character, complex in its construction and usually achieved by a sequence of analogies difficult to interpret.

At the movement's core—which was modelled after the great French decadentist poets   Mallarmé, Rimbaud and Verlaine—was a group of Italian poets, called hermeticists, who followed the style of Giuseppe Ungaretti and Eugenio Montale.

Themes and styles
Rejecting any direct social and political involvement, in order to detach themselves from the fascist culture, the hermetic group used a difficult and closed style in the analogic form, with a constant emotional introspection. Among these young intellectuals, some took strong anti-fascist stances, with Romano Bilenchi, Elio Vittorini, Alfonso Gatto and Vasco Pratolini being the main dissidents. "Tradition is Hermeticism's best ally".

Hermetic poetry opposes verbal manipulation and the ease of mass communication, which began taking place during Europe's dictatorial years, with the increasing brain-washing propaganda of the nazi-fascist regimes. Poetry therefore retreats into itself and assumes the task of returning sense to words, giving them back their semantic meaning, using them only when strictly necessary.

The hermetic poets pursue the ideal of a "pure poesy", an essential composition without educational aims. Their central theme is the desperate sense of loneliness modern man experiences, having lost the ancient values and myths of the romantic and positivistic society, no longer retaining any certitudes to refer to. Man lives in an incomprehensible world, ravaged by wars and enslaved by dictatorships, therefore the poet has a disheartened vision of life, without illusions, and repudiates the word as an act of communication in order to give it an evocative sense only. So, hermetic poetry is poetry of moods, of interior reflection expressed by a subdued and pensive tone, through a refined and evocative language, concealing direct intimations to experience in a play of allusions.

To describe the fleeting course of human life, Quasimodo would compose this famous hermetic poem "Ed è subito sera":
Ognuno sta solo sul cuor della terra
trafitto da un raggio di sole
ed è subito sera

The hermetic poets took their inspiration from Ungaretti's second book, Sentimento del Tempo ("The Feeling of Time", 1933), with its complex analogies: one can thus consider Ungaretti as Hermeticism's first exponent.

In the field of hermetic literary critique, Carlo Bo was its main interpreter, with his discourse La letteratura come vita ("Literature as a way of life") dated 1938, where he wrote the actual  hermetic manifesto by describing poetry as a moment of Absolute. Among the other critics and theoreticians, to be mentioned are Oreste Macrì, Giansiro Ferrata, Luciano Anceschi and Mario Luzi.

During the second half of the 1930s, and important hermetic group arose in Florence, around the Italian magazines  Il Frontespizio and Solaria who were inspired by the works of Giuseppe Ungaretti, Salvatore Quasimodo e Arturo Onofri, and directly referred to European symbolism, also approaching more recent movements such as surrealism and existentialism.

See also

Symbolism
 Surrealism
 Existentialism
 Decadentism
 Corrente di Vita
 Novecento Italiano
 Recapitulation theory

Notes

Bibliography
Ebeling, Florian, The secret history of Hermes Trismegistus: Hermeticism from ancient to modern times [Translated from the German by David Lorton] (Cornell University Press: Ithaca, 2007), .
Festugière, A.-J.,La révélation d'Hermès Trismégiste. 2e éd., 3 vol., Paris 1981.
Fowden, Garth, 1986. The Egyptian Hermes: A Historical Approach to the Late Pagan Mind. Cambridge: Cambridge University Press (Princeton University Press, 1993): deals with Thoth (Hermes) from his most primitive known conception to his later evolution into Hermes Trismegistus, as well as the many books and scripts attributed to him.)
Yates, Frances A., Giordano Bruno and the Hermetic Tradition. University of Chicago Press, 1964. .
 
 
 
 Churton, Tobias.  The Golden Builders: Alchemists, Rosicrucians, and the First Freemasons.  New York: Barnes and Noble, 2002.
 Copenhaver, B.P. Hermetica, Cambridge University Press, Cambridge, 1992.
  Published Posthumously
 Hoeller, Stephan A.  On the Trail of the Winged God: Hermes and Hermeticism Throughout the Ages, Gnosis: A Journal of Western Inner Traditions (Vol. 40, Summer 1996). Also at

External links
 Hermeticism (Italian literature) — Encyclopædia Britannica
 Online Version of the Corpus Hermeticum, version translated by John Everard in 1650 CE from Latin version
 Online Version of The Virgin of the World of Hermes Trismegistus, version translated by Anna Kingsford and Edward Maitland in 1885 A.D.
 Online version of The Kybalion (1912)
 The Kybalion Resource Page
 An introduction to Hermeticism by Paul Newall (2004)
  Hermetics Resource Site—Many Hermetics texts
 
 TransAlchemy-Modern scientific and singularitarian Hermetic research
 Hermetic poetry in Italian literature 
 Hermeticism as a philosophic current

Hermeticism
Italian poetry
Esoteric schools of thought
Esotericism